Rauli Tsirekidze or Raul Tsirek'idze (born 24 May 1987, in Kutaisi, Georgian SSR) is a Georgian weightlifter competing in the 85 kg category. He participated in the 2008 and 2012 Summer Olympics.

On 21 November 2016 the IOC disqualified him from the 2012 Olympic Games and struck his results from the record for failing a drugs test in a re-analysis of his doping sample from 2012.

References

External links
 

1987 births
Living people
Male weightlifters from Georgia (country)
Olympic weightlifters of Georgia (country)
Weightlifters at the 2008 Summer Olympics
Weightlifters at the 2012 Summer Olympics
Sportspeople from Kutaisi
Doping cases in weightlifting
Sportspeople from Georgia (country) in doping cases
European Weightlifting Championships medalists
21st-century people from Georgia (country)